Ikina Morsch (born 5 July 1956) is a Dutch former gymnast. She competed at the 1972 Summer Olympics.

References

External links
 

1956 births
Living people
Dutch female artistic gymnasts
Olympic gymnasts of the Netherlands
Gymnasts at the 1972 Summer Olympics
People from Heiloo
Sportspeople from North Holland